Dennis Lota (8 November 1973 – 4 February 2014) was a Zambian football striker.

He started his professional career with Zanaco FC of Zambia in 1989 before leaving for Nchanga Rangers at the beginning of the 1991 season. At Nchanga Rangers he established a midfield partnership with Abeauty Kunda. He later left Nchanga to join Kabwe Warriors after a failed attempt to rejoin Zanaco. At Warriors, he never settled and left after one season to join Konkola Blades.

It was at Konkala where the late brother to Kalusha Bwalya, Benjamin transformed Lota from a midfielder to a lethal striker who went on to win the golden boot in 1995 and later became a strong target for international clubs.

A contractual conflict later emerged between FC Sion and Dangerous Aces with each team claiming to be the rightful owner of the player. The matter was later resolved and Lota went on to play for the former.
Upon leaving FC Sion, Lota joined Orlando Pirates where his prowess in front of the goal and particularly his celebration (rubbing his palms against each other), earned him the nickname "Chesa Mpama" (loosely translated as "hot slap" in Zulu, one of the 11 official languages in South Africa.

He was part of the Zambian African Nations Cup teams in 1996, 1998, 2000 and 2002.
He has two brothers who are also footballers, Charles Lota (younger) and Lawrence Lota (older). At the 2002 African Cup of Nations, Dennis played alongside Charles in the Zambian attack formation.

In March 2011, the football team Moroka Swallows had elevated Dennis Lota to the first team as one of the assistant coaches.

Lota died on 4 February 2014 in South Africa of suspected malaria. Before his death following a brief illness in 2014, he served as an assistant coach at South African football club Moroka Swallows.

References

External links
 

1973 births
2014 deaths
People from Kitwe
Zambian footballers
Zambian expatriate footballers
Zambia international footballers
1996 African Cup of Nations players
1998 African Cup of Nations players
2000 African Cup of Nations players
2002 African Cup of Nations players
Kabwe Warriors F.C. players
Espérance Sportive de Tunis players
Dangerous Darkies players
Mpumalanga Black Aces F.C. players
Orlando Pirates F.C. players
AmaZulu F.C. players
Moroka Swallows F.C. players
FC Sion players
Expatriate footballers in Switzerland
Expatriate footballers in Tunisia
Expatriate soccer players in South Africa
Zambian expatriate sportspeople in South Africa
F.C. AK players
Association football forwards